Philippe Bouvatier (born 12 June 1964) is a French former professional road bicycle racer. He competed in the team time trial event at the 1984 Summer Olympics.

Major results

1981
 3rd, Road World Championships, Juniors
1982
 1st, Duo Normand (with Bruce Péan)
 1st, National Road Championships, Juniors
1984
 2nd, Paris–Troyes
 3rd, Tour de L'Avenir
1986
 Vuelta a Murcia
 2nd, Stage 3
 2nd, Stage 4a
1988
 1st, Duo Normand (with Thierry Marie)
 1st, Lisieux Criterium
 1st, Polynormande
 3rd, Chrono des Herbiers
1990
 2nd, Riom
1991
 1st, Stage 4, Tour Méditerranéen
 1st, Amiens
1992
 3rd, Izegem
1994
 3rd, Grand Prix d'Isbergues

References

External links 

1964 births
Living people
French male cyclists
Sportspeople from Rouen
Cyclists at the 1984 Summer Olympics
Olympic cyclists of France
Cyclists from Normandy